The grey-and-gold warbler (Myiothlypis fraseri) is a species of bird in the family Parulidae.
It is found in Ecuador and Peru.
Its natural habitats are subtropical or tropical dry forests and subtropical or tropical moist lowland forests. Aspects of the grey-and-gold warbler's breeding biology were recently described by Miller et al. (2007), based on a sample of two nests. It was named after British zoologist and collector Louis Fraser.

One nest, in the Jorupe Reserve (owned and operated by the Fundación Jocotoco) of southwest Ecuador, contained two well-feathered nestlings when discovered by the authors. The adults were observed to feed the nestlings one after the other, in quick succession. The nest, a domed cup with a side entrance, was built into the side of a steep ravine and tucked under a liana such that the slope of the hill and the top of the nest were even. The young, when they fledged from the nest, flew successfully from the rim of the cup and out of view.

The second nest was found by the authors in the Tumbes Reserved Zone, northwest Peru. When discovered, it contained four creamy white eggs with pinkish-orange and red-brown speckles concentrated at the larger ends. Like the first nest, this second was built into a steep slope and, in this case, embedded in a natural depression at the base of a Chrysophyllum tree.

After the young fledged, the first nest was collected and carefully dissected into its component parts. The nest was composed of two, distinct linings placed within the body of the nest. The lower portion of the body was tightly woven and readily distinguished from the loosely interwoven dome. Materials used included: dry grass; dark, flexible fibers; pale fibers; and skeletonized leaves.

References

 Miller, E.T., H.F. Greeney, K. Zyskowski, & R.A. Gelis. 2007. First description of the nest and eggs of the Gray-and-gold Warbler (Basileuterus fraseri). Ornitologia Neotropical 18:617-622.

grey-and-gold warbler
Birds of Ecuador
Birds of Peru
Birds of the Tumbes-Chocó-Magdalena
grey-and-gold warbler
grey-and-gold warbler
Taxonomy articles created by Polbot